The Facts of Life is the second studio album by English indie rock band Black Box Recorder, released on 1 May 2000.

Track listing
All songs written by Luke Haines and John Moore.
 "The Art of Driving"  – 4:25
 "Weekend"  – 2:27
 "The English Motorway System"  – 4:40
 "May Queen"  – 3:39
 "Sex Life"  – 2:56
 "French Rock'N'Roll"  – 3:01
 "The Facts of Life"  – 4:37
 "Straight Life"  – 4:09
 "Gift Horse"  – 3:30
 "The Deverell Twins"  – 2:43
 "Goodnight Kiss"  – 3:45

Bonus tracks
"Start as You Mean to Go On"  – 2:30
<li>"Brutality"  – 2:19

Personnel
Black Box Recorders
Sarah Nixey - vocals
John Moore - instruments
Luke Haines - instruments
with:
Chris Wyles - additional drums on "The English Motorway System" and "May Queen"
Tim Weller - additional drums on "The Facts of Life", "Straight Life" and "The Deverell Twins"
Technical
Pete Hofmann - engineer, mixing
Alasdair McLellan - model photography
Perou - band photography

Charts

References

2000 albums
Black Box Recorder albums
Albums produced by Phil Vinall